Tufa Shujineng (died 279) was a Xianbei chieftain who lived during the Three Kingdoms period of China. As the leader of the Tufa tribe of Hexi, he led a tribal rebellion in Liang and Qin provinces against the ruling Western Jin dynasty between 270 and 279. Shujineng killed many of the Western Jin generals sent against him, in 279, he was able to capture Liang province. However, he was soon defeated and killed by the Jin general, Ma Long.

Life

Background 
Tufa Shujineng's grandfather was Tufa Shoutian (禿髮壽闐) and his great-grandfather was Pigu (匹孤). Pigu was the son of the Tuoba Xianbei chieftain Tuoba Jifen (拓跋詰汾) and his brother was Tuoba Liwei. Pigu led his branch of Xianbei to Hexi when Liwei succeeded his father as chieftain in 218. 

There are two theories as to how the Tufa got their name. The first being that the words 'Tufa' (禿髮) and 'Tuoba' (拓拔) were homonyms, and were used as a derogatory term against Pigu's branch since Tufa means 'bald hair'. The more traditional view is that it was Shoutian who named the clan 'Tufa' after his nickname. Shoutian's mother, Lady Huye (胡掖氏), gave birth to him on a blanket, and the Xianbei word for blanket is 'Tufa', leading to Shoutian name. It is unknown when Shoutian died, but he was succeeded by his grandson, Tufa Shujineng. Shujineng was described by historians as both brave and resolute as well as cunning and crafty.

When the Cao Wei general, Deng Ai, was stationed in the north west between 256 and 263, he received the surrender of tens of thousands of Xianbei people from Hexi. He resettled them in the areas between Liang and Yong provinces, where they mingled with the local inhabitants. It is likely that the Tufa-Xianbei were among the Xianbei people resettled during this time.

Rebellion against Jin 

Due to ongoing oppression by local Chinese officials, the Xianbei chieftain Shujineng rebelled against Jin rule in 270. Although Shujineng was a Xianbei, his rebellion predominantly involved the Qiang and Di people. Hu Lie, Inspector of the Qin province camped at Wanhudui (萬斛堆; located in Gaolan County, Gansu) to campaign against him. However, after Hu Lie's reinforcements failed to arrived, Shujineng and his allies surrounded Hu Lie's army and killed him. The Inspector of Liang, Su Yu (蘇愉), led forces who were also routed and killed by Shujineng at Mount Jin (金山; located in Shandan county, Gansu province). 

With the removal of Sima Liang, Emperor Wu sent Shi Jian (石鉴) and Tian Zheng (田章) to put down the uprising. Shi Jian ordered his subordinate, Du Yu, to attack Shujineng. However, Du Yu suggested to his superior that they wait until next spring to attack Shujineng, as the rebels were still in high spirits from their victories. Shi Jian dismissed Du Yu and carried out his original plans, but he was unable to defeat Shujineng.

In 271, Shujineng was joined by the Beidi tribes (北地; in present-day Qingyang, Gansu) in his invasion of Jincheng (金城; around present-day Yuzhong County, Gansu). The Inspector of Liang province, Qian Hong, led his troops to fight Shujineng's forces, but the Qiang troops within Qian's army, dissatisfied by his mistreatment of them, rebelled and join Shujineng. Shujineng defeated and killed Qian Hong at Mount Qing (青山; located in Huan county, Gansu province) after surrounding his army.

In 275, Sima Jun campaigned against Shujineng and defeated his forces killing 3,000 rebels. In 277, Shujineng, Houdanbo (侯彈勃) and their supporters planned to raid the military-agricultural colonies in Guanzhong. However, Sima Jun's subordinate, Wen Yang, led a combined force of troops from Liang, Qin and Yong provinces to threaten Shujineng. Shujineng sent Houdanbo and twenty tribesmen to submit to Jin, each sending their sons as hostages. At the same time, Wen Yang also received the surrender of 200,000 tribal people from Anding, Wuwei (武威郡; in present-day Jingyuan County, Gansu) and Jincheng (金城; around present-day Yuzhong County, Gansu).

Shujineng and the tribes revolted again in 278. That year, the Inspector of Liang, Yang Xin, fought with Shujineng's ally, Ruoluobaneng (若羅拔能) on the Dang Ranges (丹嶺) in Wuwei, but was defeated and beheaded. Shujineng continued to harass Jin's borders, and by the beginning of 279, Shujineng managed to capture Liang province.

Battle of Liang province and death 
A junior Jin general by the name of Ma Long volunteered to lead a Jin army of 3,500 elite soldiers and defeat Shujineng. After Ma Long crossed the Wen River (溫水; east of present-day Jingyuan County, Gansu), Shujineng had tens of thousands of his soldiers occupy the passes to defend block Ma Long's front and while the others set up ambushes to block Ma Long's rear. During their battles with Ma Long, Shujineng's soldiers encountered the enemies' 'flat box carts' (偏箱車; a cart with a board on one side which acts like a shield) and 'deer-antlered carts' (鹿角車; a cart with spears or halberds on the front shaped like antlers). The rebels were unable to harm the Jin troops with their arrows, while the Jin troops killed and injured many of them as they marched through the narrow passes. It is also said that Ma Long placed 'magnetic stones' on the ground to slow down the rebel troops, who they and their horses generally wore iron armour as opposed to the Jin troops who wore rhinoceros hide armour. Shujineng's rebels thought that Ma Long's soldiers were divine beings.

Regardless of its historicity, Ma Long's campaign saw the end of Shujineng's raids. Once Ma Long reached Wuwei, Shujineng's allied chieftains, Cubahan (猝跋韓) and Zuwanneng (且萬能), surrendered to Ma Long along with the ten thousand troops under them. In December 279, Ma Long, with the help of Meiguneng (沒骨能) and other tribal leaders, decisively defeated Shujinengs' army and Shujineng was killed. Another account states that after Shujineng was defeated, he was assassinated by his subordinates, who then submitted to Ma Long. 

With peace restored, Shujineng was replaced by his younger cousin, Tufa Wuwan (禿髮務丸), as their tribe's leader. Wuwan's great-great-grandson, Tufa Wugu (Prince Wu), would later found the Southern Liang dynasty during the Sixteen Kingdoms period.

References 

 Fang, Xuanling (ed.) (648). Book of Jin (Jin Shu).
 Sima, Guang (1084). Zizhi Tongjian.
Wei, Shou (554). Book of Wei (Wei Shu).

Year of birth unknown
279 deaths
People of the Three Kingdoms
Southern Liang (Sixteen Kingdoms)
Three Kingdoms people killed in battle
Jin dynasty (266–420) people killed in action